Paramecyna is a genus of moths of the family Crambidae. It contains only one species, Paramecyna dimorphalis, which is found in Iran.

References

Spilomelinae
Taxa named by Hans Georg Amsel
Crambidae genera
Monotypic moth genera